1950 Meistaradeildin was the eighth season of Meistaradeildin, the top tier of the Faroese football league system. B36 Tórshavn won its third league title in the season.

Overview

Results

External links
Faroe Islands League Final Tables
RSSSF

Meistaradeildin seasons
Faroe
Faroe